Taunton  was a constituency represented in the House of Commons of the Parliament of the United Kingdom and its predecessors from 1295 to 2010, taking its name from the town of Taunton in Somerset. Until 1918, it was a parliamentary borough, electing two Member of Parliaments (MPs) between 1295 and 1885 and one from 1885 to 1918; the name was then transferred to a county constituency, electing one MP.

In the boundary changes that came into effect at the general election of 2010, the Boundary Commission for England replaced Taunton with a modified constituency called Taunton Deane, to reflect the district name.  The new constituency's boundaries are coterminous with the local government district of the same name.

History
Famous MPs for the borough include Thomas Cromwell.

The 1754 by-election was so fiercely contested that rioting broke out in which two people died.

In the 2005 general election, the victorious Liberal Democrats candidate in Taunton required the smallest percentage swing from the Conservative MP for them to take the seat.

Boundaries
1918–1950: The Borough of Taunton, the Urban Districts of Wellington and Wiveliscombe, and the Rural Districts of Dulverton, Taunton, and Wellington.

1950–1974: As above less Wiveliscombe Urban District. This had been absorbed by Wellington Rural District in 1933. The constituency boundaries remained unchanged.

1974–1983: As 1950 but with redrawn boundaries.

1983–2010: The Borough of Taunton Deane, and the District of West Somerset wards of Dulverton and Brushford, Exmoor, Haddon, and Quarme.

Members of Parliament

MPs 1295–1640
 Constituency created (1295)

MPs 1640–1885

MPs since 1885

Elections

Elections in the 1830s

 
 

 

Labouchere was appointed as a Lord of the Admiralty, causing a by-election.

 

 

Labouchere was appointed as vice-president of the Board of Trade, and Master of the Mint, requiring a by-election.

Elections in the 1840s

 
 
 

Bainbridge resigned by accepting the office of Steward of the Chiltern Hundreds, causing a by-election.

 

Labouchere was appointed Chief Secretary to the Lord Lieutenant of Ireland, requiring a by-election.

Elections in the 1850s

 
 

Mills' election was declared void on petition.

 

Labouchere was appointed Secretary of State for the Colonies, requiring a by-election.

 

 

 

Labouchere was elevated to the peerage, becoming Lord 1st Baron Taunton and causing a by-election.

Elections in the 1860s

 
 
 

 
 

On petition, Cox's election was scrutinised, and some of his votes were found to have been acquired by bribery, and were then struck off. This caused him to be unseated on 8 March 1869 and James was declared elected. While a petition was then lodged against James, the court ruled a petitioner who had been seated on petition could not then be petitioned against.

Elections in the 1870s
James was appointed Solicitor-General for England and Wales, causing a by-election.

Elections in the 1880s 

 

 

James was appointed Attorney General for England and Wales, requiring a by-election.

Palliser's death caused a by-election.

 

 

Allsopp succeeded to the peerage, becoming Lord Hindlip, causing a by-election.

Elections in the 1890s

Elections in the 1900s

Elections in the 1910s 

General Election 1914–15:

Another General Election was required to take place before the end of 1915. The political parties had been making preparations for an election to take place and by the July 1914, the following candidates had been selected; 
Unionist: Gilbert Wills
Liberal: James Bromley Eames

Elections in the 1920s

Elections in the 1930s

Elections in the 1940s
General Election 1939–40

Another General Election was required to take place before the end of 1940. The political parties had been making preparations for an election to take place and by the Autumn of 1939, the following candidates had been selected; 
Conservative: Edward Wickham
Labour: Charles W. Gott

Elections in the 1950s

Elections in the 1960s

Elections in the 1970s

Elections in the 1980s

Elections in the 1990s

Elections in the 2000s

See also
 List of parliamentary constituencies in Somerset

Notes and references

Sources
Robert Beatson, A Chronological Register of Both Houses of Parliament (London: Longman, Hurst, Res & Orme, 1807) 
D. Brunton & D. H. Pennington, Members of the Long Parliament (London: George Allen & Unwin, 1954)
Cobbett's Parliamentary history of England, from the Norman Conquest in 1066 to the year 1803 (London: Thomas Hansard, 1808) 
Craig, F. W. S. (1983). British parliamentary election results 1918-1949 (3 ed.). Chichester: Parliamentary Research Services. .
F W S Craig, British Parliamentary Election Results 1832-1885 (2nd edition, Aldershot: Parliamentary Research Services, 1989)
 Maija Jansson (ed.), Proceedings in Parliament, 1614 (House of Commons) (Philadelphia: American Philosophical Society, 1988)
 J E Neale, The Elizabethan House of Commons (London: Jonathan Cape, 1949)
 
 Frederic A Youngs, jr, Guide to the Local Administrative Units of England, Vol I (London: Royal Historical Society, 1979)
 The BBC/ITN Guide to the New Parliamentary Constituencies (Chichester: Parliamentary Research Services, 1983)
 Concise Dictionary of National Biography
 List of speakers: Parliaments of 1656 and 1658-9, Diary of Thomas Burton esq, volume 4: March - April 1659 (1828) at British History Online

External links
UK Constituency Maps
BBC Vote 2001
BBC Election 2005

Parliamentary constituencies in Somerset (historic)
Constituencies of the Parliament of the United Kingdom established in 1295
Constituencies of the Parliament of the United Kingdom disestablished in 2010
History of Taunton